Villano may refer to:

Vittorio Villano (born 1988), Belgian footballer
Villano de las Encartaciones, Spanish dog breed
Any of the members of the Mendoza professional wrestling family who wrestled under the ring name "Villano":
Villano I (1950–2001), real name José de Jesús Díaz Mendoza
Villano II (1949–1989), real name José Alfredo Díaz Mendoza
Villano III (1952–2018), real name Arturo Díaz Mendoza
Villano IV (born 1965), real name Thomas Díaz Mendoza
Villano V (born 1962), real name Raymundo Díaz Mendoza, Jr.
Villanos (band), an Argentinian band
Villano III Jr. (born 1998), Mexican third-generation luchador enmascarado